Giovanni Giacomo Pierantoni, also known as Gio. Giacomo Pierantoni, was a 17th-century Italian mathematician.

Works 
 

17th-century deaths
17th-century Italian mathematicians